Josef Medřický (born 25 May 1908, date of death unknown) was a Czech water polo player. He competed in the men's tournament at the 1936 Summer Olympics.

References

External links

1908 births
Year of death missing
Czechoslovak male water polo players
Olympic water polo players of Czechoslovakia
Water polo players at the 1936 Summer Olympics
Place of birth missing